Robertson County is a county located in the U.S. Commonwealth of Kentucky. As of the 2020 census, the population was 2,193. Its county seat is Mount Olivet. The county is named for George Robertson, a Kentucky Congressman from 1817 to 1821. It is Kentucky's smallest county by both total area and by population.

History
Robertson County was formed on February 11, 1867, from portions of Bracken County, Harrison County, Mason County and Nicholas County. It was named after George Robertson, a judge and member of Congress.

Politics

Geography
It is the smallest county by area in Kentucky.

Adjacent counties
 Bracken County  (north)
 Mason County  (northeast)
 Fleming County  (southeast)
 Nicholas County  (south)
 Harrison County  (west)

Demographics

At the 2000 census there were 2,266 people, 866 households, and 621 families in the county, making it the least populated county in the state. The racial makeup of the county was 98.63% White, 0.04% Black or African American, 0.04% Native American, 0.22% from other races, and 1.06% from two or more races.  0.93% of the population were Hispanic or Latino of any race.
Of the 866 households 31.10% had children under the age of 18 living with them, 57.60% were married couples living together, 9.10% had a female householder with no husband present, and 28.20% were non-families. 24.70% of households were one person and 11.10% were one person aged 65 or older.  The average household size was 2.54 and the average family size was 3.00.

The age distribution was 23.80% under the age of 18, 6.70% from 18 to 24, 27.10% from 25 to 44, 25.50% from 45 to 64, and 16.90% 65 or older.  The median age was 40 years. For every 100 females there were 94.80 males.  For every 100 females age 18 and over, there were 92.50 males.

The median household income was $30,581 and the median family income  was $35,521. Males had a median income of $27,656 versus $20,476 for females. The per capita income for the county was $13,404.  About 17.50% of families and 22.20% of the population were below the poverty line, including 30.30% of those under age 18 and 24.10% of those age 65 or over.

Communities
 Kentontown
 Mount Olivet (county seat)
 Piqua

See also

 National Register of Historic Places listings in Robertson County, Kentucky

References

 
Kentucky counties
Counties of Appalachia
1867 establishments in Kentucky
Populated places established in 1867